= Forests, Water and People in the Humid Tropics =

2004 academic non-fiction book

- Book cover
- Editors: M. Bonell; L. A. Bruijnzeel
- Language: English
- Series: International Hydrology Series
- Genre: Non-fiction
- Publisher: Cambridge University Press
- Publication date: December 2004
- Publication place: United Kingdom
- Media type: Print (hardback)
- Pages: 925
- ISBN: 978-0-521-82953-3
- OCLC: 60345742
- Dewey Decimal: 333.75 – dc22
- LC Class: 2003069746

Forests, Water and People in the Humid Tropics: Past, Present and Future Hydrological Research for Integrated Land and Water Management is a book edited by Michael Bonell and Leendert Adriaan Bruijnzeel published in 2004 by the Cambridge University Press.
